American pop singer Britney Spears has developed and endorsed a number of products; these have included books, video releases, video games, dolls, clothing, and perfumes. In 2000, Spears released a limited edition of sunglasses titled Shades of Britney. In 2001, she signed a deal with shoe company Skechers, and a $7–8 million promotional deal with Pepsi, their biggest entertainment deal at the time. Aside from numerous commercials with the latter during that year, she also appeared in a 2004 Pepsi television commercial in the theme of "Gladiators" with singers Beyoncé, Pink, and Enrique Iglesias. On June 19, 2002, she released her first multi-platform video game, Britney's Dance Beat, which received positive reviews. In March 2009, Spears was announced as the new face of clothing brand Candie's. Dari Marder, chief marketing officer for the brand, explained why they choose the singer, saying, "everybody loves a comeback and nobody's doing it better than Britney. She's just poised for even greater success." In 2010, Spears designed a limited edition line for the brand, which was released in stores in July 2010. In 2011, she teamed up with Sony, Make Up For Ever and PlentyofFish to release her music video for "Hold It Against Me", earning her $500,000 for the product placement. Spears also teamed up with Hasbro in 2012 to release an exclusive version of Twister Dance, which includes a remix of "Till the World Ends". The singer was also featured on a commercial, which was directed by Ray Kay, to promote the game. Spears was also featured on the commercial of "Twister Rave" and the game included a Twister remix of "Circus". In March 2018, it was revealed that Spears would be the face of Kenzo, a contemporary French luxury clothing house. 

Spears's range of commercial deals and products also includes beauty care products and perfumes. She released her first perfume with Elizabeth Arden, Curious in 2004, which broke the company's first-week gross for a perfume. By 2009, she had released seven more perfumes including Fantasy. In 2010, Spears released her eighth fragrance, Radiance. In March 2011, company Brand Sense filed a lawsuit against Spears and Elizabeth Arden seeking $10 million in damages, claiming that she and her father, Jamie, stopped paying their thirty-five percent commission that was agreed as part of the contract terms. In July 2011, a Los Angeles judge denied the request by the company lawyers, claiming the fact that Spears is still under conservatorship. Brand Sense, however, stated that they would appeal the decision. In 2011, Radiance was re-issued as a new perfume titled Cosmic Radiance. Worldwide, Spears sold over one million bottles in the first five years, with gross receipts of $1.5 billion. In 2016, Spears contacted Glu Mobile to create her own role-playing game, Britney Spears: American Dream. The app officially launched in May 2016 and is compatible with iOS and Android. On June 17, 2016, Spears announced the release of her twentieth fragrance, Private Show. , Spears has released 24 fragrances through Elizabeth Arden.

Fragrances 
Spears endorsed her first Elizabeth Arden perfume Curious in 2004, and made $100 million in sales in its first year. In September 2005, Spears released the fragrance Fantasy. In April 2006, Spears launched Curious: In Control as a limited edition fragrance. The same year, she released another perfume titled Midnight Fantasy. September 24, 2007 marked the release date of the fragrance collection Believe. She released her sixth perfume, Curious Heart, in January 2008. In December 2008, Spears released two more perfumes with the release of her sixth studio album Circus. In 2009, Curious won the Glammy Award for "Best Beauty Buy of 2009" by Glamour magazine readers, for Best Drugstore Fragrance.

As of 2009, Spears claimed to have sold 30 million bottles worldwide. As of 2012, her fragrances brand had grossed over $1.5 billion worldwide. According to a Daily Express newspaper report in 2013, a bottle of a Spears fragrance was sold every 15 seconds worldwide. In 2018, Spears released her twenty-fifth and first ever unisex fragrance, Prerogative. As of 2022, Spears has released thirty-six fragrances under her brand.

Toys and games

Dolls 

In 1999, Play Along Toys released the Britney Spears doll. It was the first product ever released by this toy company. The doll featured Spears with various outfits, make-up and hairstyles from her concerts, appearances, photoshoots and music videos. Yaboom Toys also made a singing Britney Spears doll that would "sing' when you pressed her belly button – along with miniature dolls & Britney concert stages/Tour Bus toy replicas.  The line of merchandise eventually included Britney porcelain dolls.

Video game 

Britney's Dance Beat is a one or two player music video game featuring songs and video appearances by Spears. The story is that players must pass "auditions" to tour as Spears' dancers. Gameplay involves pressing buttons in time with music. Symbols for buttons are arranged in a circle, resembling a clock dial. A pointer sweeps around the dial, indicating when to press each button.

The game contains five songs: "...Baby One More Time", "Oops!... I Did It Again", "Stronger", "Overprotected" and "I'm a Slave 4 U". Successful play is rewarded with "backstage passes" which unlocks features such as backstage video footage of Spears.

Mobile games 

A cell phone game created by Qplaze-RME and Sony BMG titled Adventures of Britney Spears was announced in December 2005 but was never released. Images and video footage of the game were released along with the game's press release.

Ten years later, Spears started working on a game with Glu. In 2016, she released a casual role play as a pop star game called Britney Spears: American Dream in May 2016 and it sold 500,000 copies. The freemium game was developed by Glu, the company that developed Kim Kardashian: Hollywood.

Clothing 
In March 2009, Spears was announced as the new face of Candie's, a clothing brand marketed for pre-teens and teenagers. After being the face of the line for two years, it was announced that Spears would design a limited edition collection for Candie's which would be unveiled by mid year. It premiered on July 1, 2010 with prices ranging from $14 to $78. In an interview with InStyle Magazine's website, Spears announced a few more pieces would be sold in September and October and that she would love to design for them again.

In August 2014, Spears launched an undergarment brand with the Danish company Change Lingerie, for sale online and in Change Lingerie stores.

Books

Britney mentioned she would be writing a memoir in 2022, for the upfront cost of 15M.

Other products 
Britney Spears released a range of hair care products in the supermarket chain Lidl in December 2014 in England.

Endorsements
Spears has endorsed several brands throughout her career, including Pepsi, Polaroid, McDonald's, Hasbro, Versace, NFL, Skechers, Got Milk?, Tommy Hilfiger, Clairol, Herbal Essences, Samsung, Nabisco, Virgin Mobile, Zappos, KENZO, Sbarro, ABC, HBO, Candies, Kohls, Starburst candy, Eos, iHeart Radio, Kirin Company, Apple Music, Disney, Los Angeles Dodgers, and Toyota.
She has also included endorsements in her music videos for brands such as Bvlgari, Swarovski, Volkswagen, Mazda, MateFit, PlentyOfFish, Beats Electronics, Sony, Nokia, Lamborghini, and Samsung.

Accolades

Notes

References 

Products